Club Deportivo Juvenil was a Spanish football club based in A Coruña, in the autonomous community of Galicia.

History
Founded in 1940 by former Deportivo de La Coruña player Rodrigo García Vizoso as Club Deportivo Aprendices de la Fábrica de Armas, the club changed its name to Club Deportivo Juvenil in 1945 and started to play in Tercera División in the following year.

After eight seasons in Tercera, Juvenil achieved promotion to Segunda División in 1954. It suffered immediate relegation, and after another drop followed in 1960, the club stopped to appear in any competitions in 1961 and subsequently folded in 1963, after merging with Fabril SD and becoming Deportivo's reserve team.

Season to season

1 season in Segunda División
12 seasons in Tercera División

External links
BDFutbol team profile
ArefePedia team profile 

Defunct football clubs in Galicia
Association football clubs established in 1940
Association football clubs disestablished in 1963
1940 establishments in Spain
1963 disestablishments in Spain
Sport in A Coruña
Segunda División clubs